Partidul Social Democrat may refer to:

 Social Democratic Party (Moldova)
 Social Democratic Party (Romania)